The Gabonese High Commissioner in Ottawa is the official representative of the Government in Libreville to the Government of Canada.

List of representatives

Ambassadors

High Commissioners
1. Sosthène Ngokila

References 

 
Canada
Gabon